Hal Glicksman (born 1937) is an American curator of contemporary art, educator, and writer.

Family and education 
Glicksman was born in Beverly Hills, California. He attended Beverly Hills High School between 1951–1955 and UCLA 1955–59. He graduated with a Bachelor of Fine Arts in Art History in 1956.

Career 
Glicksman's career began when he worked as a preparator at Norton Simon Museum that was under the direction of the curator Walter Hopps. At the museum, Glicksman participated in formalizing a set of professional guidelines for preparators. While also employed at the museum, Glicksman worked on the Marcel Duchamp retrospective from 1963.

Glicksman contributed to the planning and design of the Pasadena Art Museum at Carmelita Park.

Glicksman was a founding board member of the Computer Access Center. This organization makes computer technology for persons with disabilities. In 1983, Glicksman assumed the role of Director of Publications for Datamost. This was a startup company that published personal how-to books and computer games for personal computer computers. He has authored The Musical Atari and Games Apples Play.

Glicksman took on the role of the Associate Director of The Center for the Educational Applications of Brain Hemisphere Research in 1986 at California State University Long Beach. The Center was directed and managed by Betty Edwards. While working there, Glicksman produced workshops and lectures in the United States, Japan, and Europe.

Later life
In May 1997, Glicksman proposed the color theory that "White is Green" at the International Association of Color AIC Color in Kyoto, Japan. Additionally, he presented this theory and the "Percept Color Wheel at Electronic Imaging '99 San Jose, California, January 1999, and White is Green - New Schematic Diagrams at AIC Color 2001 in Rochester New York, June 2001. Glicksman returned to curating between 2005-2011 for The Getty Foundation’s Pacific Standard Time Art in L.A. 1945-1980 initiative.

References

1937 births
People from Beverly Hills, California
University of California, Los Angeles alumni
American art curators
Beverly Hills High School alumni
People associated with the Norton Simon Museum
American technology writers
California State University, Long Beach faculty
Living people